Paul Werner Wenneker (27 February 1890 – 17 October 1979) was a German admiral and diplomat. Born in Kiel, Wenneker died in Bergstedt, Hamburg.

Having joined the Kaiserliche Marine in 1909, Wenneker twice served as German Naval Attaché to Japan, first from 1935 to 1937 and again from 1940 to 1945.

As Naval Attaché, Wenneker urged that the submarines of the Imperial Japanese Navy be used to attack Allied supply ships, as Germany's U-boats were doing in the Atlantic. The Japanese rejected his advice.

Awards and decorations
 Iron Cross of 1914, 1st and 2nd class
 Spanish Cross in Gold with Swords
 War Merit Cross (1939), 1st and 2nd class with Swords
 German Cross in Silver (24 April 1944)
 Knight's Cross of the War Merit Cross with Swords (18 January 1945)
 Order of the Rising Sun, 1st Class (Japan)

References

External links
WW2DB: Paul Wenneker
Profile of Wenneker

1890 births
1979 deaths
Military personnel from Kiel
People from the Province of Schleswig-Holstein
Reichsmarine personnel
Imperial German Navy personnel of World War I
Admirals of the Kriegsmarine
German diplomats
Recipients of the Iron Cross (1914), 1st class
Recipients of the Knights Cross of the War Merit Cross
Grand Cordons of the Order of the Rising Sun
German expatriates in Japan
Naval attachés